"Do You Wanna Make Love" is a song written and performed by Peter McCann, an American songwriter. The song was featured on his 1977 album, Peter McCann. 
"Do You Wanna Make Love" was produced by Hal Yoergler.

The B-side to the single, "Right Time of the Night", was also written by McCann and was recorded by John Travolta and by Jennifer Warnes in 1976 with Warnes' version a hit single in the US in early 1977.

Chart perfomance
It reached #5 on the U.S. Billboard Hot 100 and #22 on the adult contemporary chart in 1977.   In Canada, the song hit #15, and reached #10 on the Adult Contemporary chart.  In South Africa, the song reached #1. The song reached number 11 in Australia.

The single ranked #17 on Billboard's Year-End Hot 100 singles of 1977.  It also ranked #17 on New Zealand's Top 50 singles of 1977 year-end chart.

Charting versions
David Wills released a version of the song as a single in 1977 which reached #82 on the U.S. country chart.
Millie Jackson and Isaac Hayes released a version of the song as a single in 1980 which reached #30 on the U.S. R&B chart.
Buck Owens released a version of the song as a single in 1980 which reached #74 on the Cashbox country chart and #80 on the U.S. country chart.

Other versions
Leslie Cheung released a version of the song on his 1977 album, I Like Dreamin'''.
Facts of Life released a version of the song on their 1978 album, A Matter of Fact.
The New Seekers released a version of the song as a single in 1978 in the United Kingdom.
Peter Doyle released a version of the song as a single in 1980 in the United Kingdom.

In popular culture
The song was included in the musical comedy Disaster!''
The song was being played on New York radio station WABC (AM) while the lights went out to begin the New York City blackout of 1977, during sportscaster George Michael’s shift on the air. Michael’s coverage of the event became one of the highlights of his career.

References

1977 songs
1977 debut singles
1978 singles
1980 singles
Songs written by Peter McCann
Peter McCann songs
Number-one singles in South Africa
The New Seekers songs
Millie Jackson songs
Isaac Hayes songs
Buck Owens songs
United Artists Records singles
20th Century Fox Records singles
CBS Records singles